Yáñez is a Spanish language surname. Notable people with the surname include: 

 Adrian Yanez, American mixed martial artist
 Agustín Yáñez, Mexican writer and politician
 Benjamin Yañez Garcia (born 1989) 
 Desideria Quintanar de Yáñez, first woman to join the Church of Jesus Christ of Latter-day Saints in Mexico
 Eduardo Yáñez (born 1960)
 Emmanuel Yáñez (born 1985), Uruguayan road cyclist
 Jeronimo Yanez, American police officer who shot Philando Castile
 José María Yáñez (1803–1880), Mexican war hero of the war of independence from Spain
 Mario Yáñez, Mexican squash player
 Puri Yáñez (born 1936) Spanish-born surrealist painter
 René Yañez (1942–2018), Mexican-American artist, curator, and community activist
 Rio Yañez (born 1980), artist and curator
 Rubén Yáñez, Spanish footballer
 Vicente Yáñez Pinzón (c.1462–after 1514), Spanish navigator, explorer, and conquistador

Spanish-language surnames